The 1981 Cal State Fullerton Titans football team represented California State University, Fullerton as a member of the Pacific Coast Athletic Association (PCAA) during the 1981 NCAA Division I-A football season. Led by second-year head coach Gene Murphy, Cal State Fullerton compiled an overall record of 3–8 with a mark of 1–4 in conference play, tying for fifth place in the PCAA. The Titans played home games at Titan Field on the Cal State Fullerton campus. The football team shared the stadium with the Cal State Fullerton Titans baseball from 1980 to 1982.

Schedule

References

Cal State Fullerton
Cal State Fullerton Titans football seasons
Cal State Fullerton Titans football